The Research and Intervention Brigade (BRI) is a shock group inspired by the French BIS. The BIS was created in 2005 to replace the Police Special Intervention Unit (UISP) which was disbanded earlier.

History 
The BRI officially replaced the then elite UISP in 2005. However, the BIS is affiliated to the Judicial Police, unlike the UISP, which was directly affiliated to the General Directorate of National Security (DGSN).

From 2005, the first training courses were held with the BIS in Paris, which provides "advanced" training for members of this group.

In 2007 and 2008, the Intervention Group of the French National Police provides training courses for members of the BRI. In 2008, some 40 police officers went to the United States for training in countering maritime piracy.

Missions 
The missions of the BRI are :

 To apprehend groups of criminals engaged in serious acts of banditry...
 Release of hostages
 Surveillance and tailing in order to search and archive all information relating to banditry
 Maintaining order
 Anti-drugs and anti-weapon control
 Surveillance patrols
 The anti-gang

Equipment

Armament

Handgun 
 Glock 17
 Beretta 92
 Smith&Wesson Sigma
 Caracal

Assault rifles and machine pistols 
 AKMS
 HK MP5

Precision rifles 
 Sako TRG 22
 Accuracy International AWP

Others 
 Crossbow
 Taser X26

Individual equipment 
 helmet with visor (and without)
 Protective goggles
 Navy blue tactical suit
 Tactical vest
 Bullet-proof vest
 Rangers
 Belt
 Gloves
 Radio
 Headset

Vehicles 
 Toyota Land Cruiser
 Mercedes G-Class
 Mercedes Sprinter
 Nissan Patrol armoured
 Unmarked vehicles

Aerial 
 AW-109 of the Algerian Police

References

Law enforcement in Algeria